A town is an incorporated urban municipality in the Canadian province of Manitoba. Under current legislation, a community must have a minimum population of 1,000 and a minimum density of 400 people per square kilometre to incorporate as an urban municipality. As an urban municipality, the community has the option to be named a town, village or urban municipality. It also has the option of being named a city once it has a minimum population of 7,500 (there are no towns currently eligible for city status; the closest is Niverville, with a population of 5,947 in the Canada 2021 Census).

Manitoba has 25 towns that had a cumulative population of 56,946 in the 2016 census. The province's largest and smallest towns by population are The Pas and Grand Rapids with populations of 5,369 and 268 respectively. The province previously had 50 towns before a series of provincially mandated amalgamations took effect on January 1, 2015.

Communities meeting the population minimum are not always incorporated as urban municipalities.  There are 22 unincorporated communities with a population of more than 1,000 within Manitoba's rural municipalities.  The largest of these is Oakbank in the Rural Municipality of Springfield with a population of 4,604.

List 

Notes

Former towns 
A list of formerly incorporated towns, excluding current and former cities that previously held town status.

Notes

See also 
List of communities in Manitoba
List of ghost towns in Manitoba
List of municipalities in Manitoba
List of cities in Manitoba
List of rural municipalities in Manitoba
List of local urban districts in Manitoba
List of villages in Manitoba
Manitoba municipal amalgamations, 2015

References 

Towns